Nieciecz may refer to the following places:
Nieciecz, Lublin Voivodeship (east Poland)
Nieciecz, Lubusz Voivodeship (west Poland)
Nieciecz, Masovian Voivodeship (east-central Poland)